Stefani is a name of Italian origin.

People with the given name
 Stefani Bismpikou (born 1988), Greek Olympic gymnast
 Stefani Carter (born 1978), Texas politician
 Stefani Germanotta (born 1986), American pop singer, also known as Lady Gaga
 Stefani Hid (born 1985), Indonesian writer
 Stefani Miglioranzi (born 1977), Brazilian-American footballer
 Stefani Popova (born 1993), Bulgarian biathlete
 Stefani Schaeffer (born 1974), American attorney and TV presenter 
 Stefani Stoeva (born 1995), Bulgarian badminton player
 Stefani Werremeier (born 1968), German Olympic rower

People with the surname
 Alberto De Stefani (1879–1969), Italian politician
 Andrea Stefani, Albanian journalist
 Attila Stefáni (born 1973), Hungarian motorcycle speedway rider
 Catherine Stefani, American politician
 Danilo Stefani (born 1979), Italian footballer
 Enrico Stefani, Italian architect and archaeologist
 Eric Stefani (born 1967), American musician and animator
 Francesco Stefani (film director) (1923–1989), German film director 
 Francesco Stefani (born 1971), Italian slalom canoer 
 Graciela Stefani (born 1960), Argentine screen and stage actress
 Guglielmo Stefani (1819–1861), Italian journalist
 Gwen Stefani (born 1969), American pop, rock, R&B and ska singer
 Irene Stefani (1891-1930), born Aurelia Mercede Stefani, Italian member of the Consolata Missionary Sisters
 Joseph De Stefani (1879-1940), American character actor
 Julian Stefani (born 1939), Australian politician
 Luca Stefani (born 1987), Italian long track speed skater
 Luis Stefani, Chancellor of the University of Puerto Rico
 Luisa Stefani (born 1997), Brazilian tennis player
 Margaret Stefani (1917–1964), infielder and chaperone in the All-American Girls Professional Baseball League
 Mario Stefani (1938-2001, Italian poet
 Mirko Stefani (born 1984), Italian footballer
 Pier Luigi Stefani, Italian TV producer
 Shawn Stefani (born 1981), American professional golfer
 Simon Stefani (1929–2000), Albanian politician
 Stefano Stefani (born 1938), Venetist Italian politician
 Tommaso de Stefani (c. 1250–c. 1310), Italian painter of the Renaissance period
Paul Michael Stephani, US killer and prisoner

See also
 Stefani (disambiguation)
 Stefano
 Stephanie

References

Italian-language surnames
Patronymic surnames
Surnames from given names